Lepidotidae is an extinct family of fish, known from the Jurassic and Cretaceous periods. Most species were originally assigned to the genus Lepidotes which was long considered a wastebasket taxon. Cladistic analysis has indicated that they are close relatives of gars, with both being members of the order Lepisosteiformes. Members of the family are known from both marine and freshwater environments. Lepidotes sensu stricto had peg-like grasping marginal teeth and crushing palatal teeth, and is known to have consumed small crustaceans, while Scheenstia had low rounded crushing marginal teeth, indicating a durophagous diet.

Taxonomy 

 Lepidotes Agassiz, 1832
 Scheenstia López-Arbarello & Sferco, 2011
 Camerichthys Bermúdez-Rochas & Poyato-Ariza, 2015
 Isanichthys Cavin and Suteethorn 2006

References 

Lepisosteiformes
Prehistoric ray-finned fish families